Luc-André Bouchard (born 18 November 1949) is a Canadian bishop of the Roman Catholic Church. Appointed by Benedict XVI, Bouchard is the ninth Bishop of Trois-Rivières.

Early life and education
Born in Cornwall, Ontario, Canada of Gaston Bouchard and Lucienne Morin, Bouchard studied at The Royal Conservatory of Music of Toronto where he received a Grade X Certificate for piano in 1968. He received a Bachelor of Arts in 1971 from the University of Ottawa. At the Dominican University College in Ottawa, he received his Bachelor of Theology in 1974 and Licentiate of Theology in  1977.

Continuing his studies, Bouchard studied Sacred Scripture at the Pontifical Biblical Institute in Rome, receiving his Licentiate of Sacred Scripture in 1983. He then studied in Jerusalem at l'École Biblique et Archéologique where he received his diploma in 1981.

Priesthood

Parish Work
On September 4, 1976, Bouchard was ordained a priest in the Diocese of Alexandria-Cornwall. He was appointed assistant pastor of the Co-cathédral de la Nativité de la Bienheureuse Vierge Marie between 1976 and 1979, and again between 1984 and 1986. He then became administrator of the Co-cathedral in 1986 and then rector in 1986–1987. Bouchard then went on to become an assistant pastor at the parish Ste-Thérèse-de-Lisieux in 1983. Between 1987 and 1990, Bouchard became the parish priest of the parish Saints-Martyrs Canadiens. Between 1994 and 1999, Bouchard became parish priest of the parish Sacré-Coeur.

Professor
Bouchard taught at the seminary in Montréal, Québec between 1985 and 1990. Equally, in 1990 to 1994 and again in 1999, Bouchard was a member of vocation formations of the seminary Saint-Joseph in Edmonton, Alberta. In 1999, he became the director of the seminary and the rector in 2000.

Episcopal career

On September 8, 2001, when he was still rector of the Saint-Joseph seminary in Edmonton, Bouchard was nominated to be the Bishop of Saint Paul in Alberta. He was consecrated by Archbishop Thomas Christopher Collins the then Archbishop of Edmonton on November 9, 2011.
Within the Canadian Conference of Catholic Bishops Bouchard was a member of the permanent council and of many other Episcopal Commissions. He was also the President of the Episcopal Commission of Theology. In 2008, he was one of the Canadian delegates of the Synod of Bishops on the Bible held in Rome. Currently, he remains a member of the 
Episcopal Commission of Doctrine.
On February 2, 2012, Pope Benedict XVI appointed Bouchard Bishop of Trois-Rivières to succeed Bishop Martin Veillette, who reached the age of 75 and, by Canon Law, must submit his resignation to the Pope. Bouchard's enthronement took place on March 26, 2012 at the Cathédral de l'Assomption de Marie in Trois-Rivières.

References

1949 births
Living people
Pontifical Biblical Institute alumni
21st-century Roman Catholic bishops in Canada
People from Cornwall, Ontario
University of Ottawa alumni
Roman Catholic bishops of Saint Paul, Alberta
Roman Catholic bishops of Trois-Rivières